ONE: Bad Blood was a Combat sport event produced by ONE Championship that took place on February 11, 2022, at the Singapore Indoor Stadium in Kallang, Singapore.

Background
Bibiano Fernandes was scheduled to make his second ONE bantamweight title defense against John Lineker in the main event. However, Lineker tested positive for COVID days before the event and the bout was pulled and However, the bout was moved to ONE: Lights Out.

An interim ONE Heavyweight World Championship bout between Anatoly Malykhin and Kiril Grishenko was scheduled for ONE: Only the Brave, but the bout was moved to this event and was promoted to the main event.

Former ONE Flyweight Muay Thai Champion Jonathan Haggerty will make his return to action when he faces #4-ranking Flyweight Muay Thai Mongkolpetch Petchyindee Academy.

A strawweight bout between former ONE Strawweight Champion Yosuke Saruta and Gustavo Balart was planned for the event. However, Saruta tested positive for COVID days before the event and the bout will be rescheduled.

A welterweight bout between former title challenger Ken Hasegawa and Murad Ramazanov was scheduled for the event. However, Hasegawa was injured and out of his clash with Murad Ramazanov, the bout is set to be rebooked.

The Filipina fighter Jenelyn Olsim was set to faces Jihin Radzuan of Malaysia in a women's atomweight bout. However, a two days before the event, Olsim withdrew from the bout, reportedly because she has suffered an injury during her training. She was replaced by Mei Yamaguchi.

Results

Bonus awards
The following fighters were awarded bonuses:
$100,000 Performance of the Night: Anatoly Malykhin
$50,000 Performance of the Night: Jonathan Haggerty and Woo Sung Hoon

See also 

 2022 in ONE Championship
 List of ONE Championship events
 List of current ONE fighters

References 

Events in Singapore
ONE Championship events
2022 in mixed martial arts
Mixed martial arts in Singapore
Sports competitions in Singapore
February 2022 sports events in Singapore